Frederick Dello Russo is an American politician and funeral director who served as a member of the Medford, Massachusetts city council, Mayor of Medford (a ceremonial position), and the Massachusetts House of Representatives.

References

1943 births
American funeral directors
Mayors of Medford, Massachusetts
Democratic Party members of the Massachusetts House of Representatives
Living people